Maskoy, or Toba-Maskoy, is one of several languages of the Paraguayan Chaco (Particularly in the northern region of Paraguay) called Toba. It is spoken on a reservation near Puerto Victoria. Toba-Maskoy is currently a threatened language at risk of becoming an extinct language, due to the low number of native speakers.

History 
Toba-Maskoy was derived from Paraguay, specifically in the Chaco region of the Alto Paraguay department.

Geographic Distribution 
Toba-Maskoy is spoken near Puerto Victoria, in the north of Paraguay.

Official Status 
Though Toba-Maskoy is not the official language of Paraguay, it has a special well known status in the northern part of El Chaco.

Dialects/Varieties 
Toba Maskoy is one of the five members of the Maskoy linguistic family, the other four include: Angaite, Enxet, Kaskiha, and Sanapan.

Vocabulary and Grammar 
It is believed that around 1870 some Toba chiefs immigrated from Argentina escaping constant victimization of their peoples, thus settling in Alto Paraguay. Since that transitional period, the language suffered both linguistically and culturally. To this day it is rare to find grammar or writings in Toba-Maskoy due to a significant loss in the linguistic elements.

Number System 
According to Closs, the number 1 is always used in terms of addition. 

While the number  is derived from the word "equals", which indicates the understanding of the concept of 2- groupings. Multiplication in the Toba Number system only occurs in the form of doubling, however this number system demonstrates the understanding of additive and basic multiplicative properties.

External links 
Good News Toba-Maskoy Language Movie Trailer

References

Languages of Paraguay
Mascoian languages
Chaco linguistic area